Daniel R. White (born August 2, 1953 in Atlanta, Georgia) is an American attorney and author.  His first book, The Official Lawyer's Handbook,, a satire of the legal profession, was a bestseller in the early 1980s. The success of the Handbook, which ranked #1 on The Washington Post best seller list and presumably drew on White's personal experience practicing law with the Washington, D.C., law firm of Hogan & Hartson, led to television appearances, speaking engagements, and other books, as a result of which The American Lawyer magazine declared White "The Official Lawyer's Comedian."

Calling the Handbook his "vehicle of liberation from the practice of law," White left the private practice of law in 1983. He now makes his living in various word-related ways, including as a writer, editor, corporate entertainer, legal comedian, legal writing instructor, and college essay consultant.

Personal

White graduated from The Westminster Schools, a co-educational college preparatory school in Atlanta, Georgia.  He obtained a B.A. in Government from Harvard College, graduating magna cum laude in 1975.

After college, he traveled to Seoul, Korea, where he wrote and edited travel articles for the Korea National Tourism Corporation (later renamed the Korea Tourism Organization), an agency of the Republic of Korea.

The following year he attended Columbia Law School, where he obtained a J.D. in 1979.  He served as Articles Editor of the Columbia Law Review,  which published his first legal writing, "Pacifica Foundation v. FCC:  'Filthy Words,' the First Amendment, and the Broadcast Media,"  during White's second year.  That article, which discussed a ruling by the U.S. Court of Appeals for the District of Columbia Circuit on comedian George Carlin's famous "Seven Dirty Words" monologue,  was cited by the U.S. Supreme Court in a related ruling.

At Columbia, White was a Harlan Fiske Stone scholar and the recipient of the Archie O. Dawson Advocacy Award, which provided clerkships for the study of advocacy at the three levels of the federal judiciary, including a period in the chambers of U.S. Supreme Court Justice Thurgood Marshall.

White served as law clerk to U.S. District Court judge Thomas A. Flannery, and then joined Hogan & Hartson, where he spent roughly 3 years.  Upon leaving Hogan & Hartson, he spent 4 years to promoting his first book, commencing his career as a public speaker and corporate entertainer, and attempting without success to become a screenwriter.  For several years White practiced law sporadically with the firm of Ross, Dixon & Masback.  Thereafter, for just over a year, White worked as a legal business consultant for the accounting and consulting firm Arthur Andersen.  There he consulted primarily for corporate law departments, where he performed such tasks as a substantive and stylistic overhaul of Exxon's "Guidelines for Use of Outside Counsel."

Professional

Writing
Daniel White's first book, The Official Lawyer's Handbook, ranked #1 on The Washington Post best seller list and #5 on the Publishers Weekly national list. On the basis of this book The Washington Post declared White "the legal profession's court jester" and credited him with having "helped launch the current wave of legal humor."

This book was re-released in updated form as Still the Official Lawyer's Handbook, and then released in revised form in Britain, with Philip R. Jenks as co-author.

White's reputation as a legal humorist was fostered by his other books, especially White's Law Dictionary, a parody of the classic legal lexicon, Black's Law Dictionary; Trials and Tribulations – An Anthology of Appealing Legal Humor; and What Lawyers Do – And How To Make Them Work for You, a light-in-tone but essentially substantive book that enjoyed the distinction of becoming a Book-of-the-Month Club selection.

White has also written a number of relatively minor volumes,  a nonexhaustive list of which includes The Classic Cocktails Book, The Martini, Really Redneck, The Birthday Book, and Horrorscopes.

Less known as a journalist, White has published articles for publications ranging from the American Bar Association Journal to Cosmopolitan.  A number of other publications have carried articles by Daniel R. White, including Of Counsel, Barrister, Medical Meetings, the Atlanta Journal-Constitution, Atlanta, The Washington Weekly, Minnesota Law & Politics, Docket (ACCA), Employment Law Strategist, Marketing for Lawyers, and Law Firm Partnership & Benefits Report.

Although even less known as a poet, White's tribute to legal warriors, "An Ode to Litigation," met with general acclaim when it appeared in the National Law Journal, and one of its 32 stanzas is quoted in Jennifer L. Pierce's treatise, Gender Bender Trials:  Emotional Lives in Contemporary Law Firms:

Editing
At the New York Law Publishing Company, where he worked from 1994 to 1996, White served as editor-in-chief and primary writer for Law Firm Partnership & Benefits Report, a national newsletter for law firm partners and managers.  He served as managing editor of two other national newsletters for lawyers, Employment Law Strategist and Marketing for Lawyers, and edited articles for the National Law Journal.

White has also established himself as a freelance editor of non-fiction monographs.

Jokes
Although his roots lie in legal comedy, White has demonstrated a broader range, beginning in 1992-1993, when he served as editor-in-chief of, and primary writer for, Current Comedy, a twice-monthly "Humor Service for Public Speakers & Business Executives" founded by former television gag writer and presidential speechwriter Robert Orben.

White has written jokes for corporate executives and Jay Leno.  His parody of Ernest Hemingway's writing style appeared in The Best of Bad Hemingway, an anthology.

Entertaining
White has appeared as a legal humorist on CNN, CBS, NPR, and numerous other television and radio shows across the country.  He has been profiled in publications such as The New York Times, The Washington Post, Time magazine,  and the International Herald Tribune.

He has addressed bar associations, medical conventions, law firms, and other gatherings across the United States and abroad.

Contrasting himself with lawyers who ridicule the legal profession with "lawyer jokes"  and engage in "lawyer bashing,"  White has said his jabs are soft-gloved and affectionate, because he is "a member of that union,"  being a lawyer himself and coming from a family of lawyers.

References

1953 births
Living people
American lawyers
American humorists
Business speakers
Writers from Atlanta
Harvard College alumni
Columbia Law School alumni
American male writers
The Westminster Schools alumni